Alfons Pawelczyk (born 1933 in Parnow, Province of Pomerania) is a German politician. As a representative of the Social Democratic Party, he was Hamburg Senator (i.e. state minister) of the Interior and second mayor in Hamburg.

Pawelczyk was lieutenant colonel of the German federal armed forces and member of the German federal parliament from 1969 to 1980. He was also member of the Hamburg Parliament, in 1982 state minister (German: Senator) of the Interior, and in 1986 second mayor of Hamburg.

See also 
 List of mayors of Hamburg

References

External links 

1933 births
Living people
Mayors of Hamburg
Members of the Bundestag for Hamburg
Members of the Bundestag 1976–1980
Members of the Bundestag 1972–1976
Members of the Bundestag 1969–1972
Members of the Hamburg Parliament
Senators of Hamburg
Members of the Bundestag for the Social Democratic Party of Germany